

Seeds 

  Irina-Camelia Begu (qualifying competition)
  Heather Watson (qualified)
  Tímea Babos (qualifying competition)
  Johanna Konta (qualifying competition)
  Danka Kovinić (qualified)
  Hsieh Su-wei (first round)
  Mariana Duque (first round)
  Magda Linette (first round)
  Timea Bacsinszky (qualified)
  Alla Kudryavtseva (first round)
  Michelle Larcher de Brito (qualified)
  Kristýna Plíšková (first round)
  Andrea Hlaváčková (first round)
  Vesna Dolonc (qualifying competition)
  Lara Arruabarrena (first round)
  Olivia Rogowska (qualifying competition)
  Victoria Duval (first round)
  Lucie Hradecká (first round)
  Alexandra Panova (second round)
  Grace Min (qualified)
  Zheng Saisai (second round)
  Tadeja Majerič (first round)
  Verónica Cepede Royg (first round)
  Sofia Arvidsson (first round)

Qualifiers

Qualifying draw

First qualifier

Second qualifier

Third qualifier

Fourth qualifier

Fifth qualifier

Sixth qualifier

Seventh qualifier

Eighth qualifier

Ninth qualifier

Tenth qualifier

Eleventh qualifier

Twelfth qualifier

References
 Qualifying Draw
2014 French Open – Women's draws and results at the International Tennis Federation

Women's Singles Qualifying
French Open - Women's Singles Qualifying
French Open by year – Qualifying